The black-throated saltator (Saltatricula atricollis) is a species of songbird in the Thraupidae family.

It is found in Bolivia, Brazil, and Paraguay. Its natural habitats are subtropical or tropical dry forests and dry savanna.

References

black-throated saltator
Birds of the Cerrado
black-throated saltator
Taxa named by Louis Jean Pierre Vieillot
Taxonomy articles created by Polbot
Taxobox binomials not recognized by IUCN